Grażyna Kulczyk  (born 5 November 1950) is a Polish lawyer, investor, art collector and philanthropist.

Education and career
She graduated in law and administration from the Adam Mickiewicz University in Poznań. Upon finishing her studies, she began to work in the Civil Law Institute at her alma mater. After a few years, she resigned and decided to pursue a career in business. 

She is a champion of contemporary art and supporter of avant-garde choreography while also supporting development of new technology and start-ups working to change the world. She is particularly engaged in supporting entrepreneurship among women as well as the equal presence of women in STEM. She joined the board of the Modern Women's Fund Committee of the Museum of Modern Art, New York in 2015, and has been a board member of Museum of Modern Art in Warsaw for almost 10 years. Ms. Kulczyk has been recognised as one of the Top 200 Collectors in the world by ARTnews magazine.

Kulczyk was married to Jan Kulczyk with whom she had two children, Dominika (born 1977) and Sebastian (born 1980). They divorced in 2006.

Muzeum Susch

Muzeum Susch, founded by Kulczyk, opened on 2 January 2019, in Susch, Switzerland. It predominantly features works by renowned Polish avant-garde and contemporary artists such as Monika Sosnowska, Magdalena Abakanowicz, Piotr Uklański, Mirosław Bałka, Zofia Kulik, Paulina Olowska and Joanna Rajkowska.

Art Stations Foundation / Stary Browar Nowy Taniec 
Since 2004, Art Stations Foundation by Grażyna Kulczyk has been providing extensive support to the development of contemporary choreography through its performative programme based in  Poznań, recognized internationally under the name Stary Browar Nowy Taniec / Old Brewery New Dance.  Conceived and curated by Joanna Leśnierowska, it provided the Polish and international dance community with a unique meeting point in Central and Eastern Europe – a platform for research, creation and choreographic (self)reflection bringing forward the art of choreography in dialogue with other disciplines, examining its history, theory and future, revisiting and interrogating its own artistic, but also political and social, content and contexts.

Stary Browar Nowy Taniec is located at the Stary Browar complex in Poznan, which Grażyna Kulczyk bought in 1998, and sold in 2015, for a reported €290 million to Deutsche Asset Management.

See also
 List of Poles

References

Further reading 

 

1950 births
21st-century Polish businesspeople
Adam Mickiewicz University in Poznań alumni
Polish philanthropists
Living people
Planned new art museums and galleries
Kulczyk family
Polish women in business
Businesspeople from Poznań
Polish patrons of the arts